Sterling Hinds (born 31 October 1961) is a Canadian retired sprinter and football player. He won the bronze medal in 4 x 100 m relay at the 1984 Olympic Games, and played professional football with the Toronto Argonauts.

Hinds was born in Toronto, Ontario. He played ice hockey as a youth, rising to the level of Junior B. He attended the University of Washington on a football scholarship where he was a tailback for the Washington Huskies, and also competed in track. His most notable achievement with the Huskies was the 1982 Rose Bowl victory over the University of Iowa Hawkeyes.

At the 1984 Summer Olympics in Los Angeles, Hinds won a bronze medal in the 4 x 100 m relay together with teammates Ben Johnson, Tony Sharpe and Desai Williams in a time of 38.70 seconds.

After his track days, Hinds signed with the Toronto Argonauts of the Canadian Football League. He played 8 games in 1984 and 1985, before a knee injury ended his football career.  He then got his real estate license and is now a realtor.

Hinds' brothers Doug and Jerry were also members of the Canadian track team, with younger brother Stuart also being a Canadian national finalist.

References

External links

Database Olympics
Sterling Hinds at the Canadian Olympic Committee

1961 births
Living people
Athletes (track and field) at the 1984 Summer Olympics
Black Canadian track and field athletes
Canadian players of American football
Canadian male sprinters
Medalists at the 1984 Summer Olympics
Olympic track and field athletes of Canada
Olympic bronze medalists for Canada
Players of Canadian football from Ontario
Athletes from Toronto
Toronto Argonauts players
Washington Huskies men's track and field athletes
Washington Huskies football players
Olympic bronze medalists in athletics (track and field)
Universiade medalists in athletics (track and field)
Universiade silver medalists for Canada
Medalists at the 1983 Summer Universiade